Henning Möller (21 June 1885 – 7 February 1968) was a Swedish athlete. He competed in the men's discus throw at the 1912 Summer Olympics.

References

External links

1885 births
1968 deaths
Athletes (track and field) at the 1912 Summer Olympics
Swedish male discus throwers
Olympic athletes of Sweden
Place of birth missing